The Iconoclastic Caravans for Free Will (CIPLA) were an anarchist cell active in the Santiago Metropolitan Region, being known for some attacks in the communes of Las Condes and Vitacura. The group gained attention from the authorities for its members being closely investigated during the investigation of the Bombas Case.

Background
Since the mid-2000s, the Santiago Metropolitan Area suffered several attacks with low-intensity explosives, including banks (approximately a third of the bombs detonated in national and international banks), police stations, Carabineros and army barracks, churches, embassies, the headquarters of political parties, company offices, courts and government buildings. Explosives (commonly made from household materials) included fire extinguishers filled with gunpowder or sometimes with explosives such as ANFO, TNT or TATP. They were transported by a group of two to four people late in the morning, leaving the explosive charge, to detonate minutes later, causing material damage.

The only fatality was a young anarchist, Mauricio Morales, who died on May 22, 2009 by a bomb that detonated prematurely, killing him instantly. Since then, several anarchist cells have claimed his death as the date for the beginning of their attacks.

Attacks
The CIPLA's first attack was on June 28, 2009, when militants abandoned an explosive device at the Bricrim Chilean Investigations Police headquarters in Ñuñoa, an attack that only caused material damage. The following day the group claimed responsibility for the attack, which was linked to the allegations of corruption and alleged actions of police officers in the sexual abuse of minors.

On August 12, 2009, two explosives detonated in Santiago, the first at the Sportlife gym in Las Condes, and the other at the Balthus gym on Monseñor Escrivá de Balaguer avenue in Vitacura, both explosions only causing material damage. Days later the Iconoclastic Caravans for Free Will claimed responsibility for the double attack in a statement where it justified its attacks in those areas (those with the highest Human Development Index in Santiago). Due to the magnitude of damage and the area where the events occurred, this has been the group's most publicized attack. On November 26, 2011, the group released its last statement together with several other cells where they showed solidarity with the arrests and dismantling of some cells belonging to the Conspiracy of Cells of Fire in Greece and how this phenomenon could be replicated in Chile.

References

2009 establishments in Chile
2012 disestablishments in Chile
Anarchist organisations in Chile
Guerrilla movements in Latin America
Defunct anarchist militant groups
Rebel groups in Chile